Aden was an American band which was influenced by 1970s soft rock such as Steely Dan (from whom they borrowed the title of their albums Hey 19 and Black Cow).

History
Aden was formed at the University of Chicago in 1995, but since 1997 (when original drummer Josh Klein left the band) none of Aden's members has lived in the same city. Although the band has not recorded since 2002, guitarist and banjo player Kevin Barker has continued to play and record solo (as Currituck Co) and has collaborated live and on record with luminaries of the Naturalismo/New Weird America scene such as Vashti Bunyan, Devendra Banhart, Joanna Newsom and Vetiver.

Discography

Albums
 Aden - Fortune4 Records - 1997, re-issued by Teenbeat - 2006
 Black Cow - Teenbeat Records - 1999
 Hey 19 - Teenbeat Records - 2000
 Topsiders - Teenbeat Records - 2002

Singles
"Scooby Doo" 7 inch - 1995
"Cause of Your Tears" 7 inch - 1996

External links
Former: Teenbeat's Aden Page

Musical groups established in 1995
TeenBeat Records artists